This is a list of museums in Marche, Italy.

References

Marche
Museums in Marche